Bob Sarlatte is an American actor, comedian and sports announcer known for such films and television series as Star Trek IV: The Voyage Home, EDtv and Late Show with David Letterman.

Sarlatte was also the on-field stadium announcer for 30 years for the San Francisco 49ers football team.

Filmography

References

External links

Living people
American male film actors
21st-century American comedians
American male television actors
American sports announcers
Year of birth missing (living people)
National Football League public address announcers